Giehler may refer to:

 Torben Giehler, German painter
 Giehler Bach, upstream name of the Hamme river in north-west Germany